John Purdy may refer to:

 John Purdy (chess player) (1935–2011), Australian chess champion
 John Purdy (cricketer) (1871–1938), English cricketer
 John Purdy (hydrographer) (1773–1843), English compiler of naval charts
 John Purdy (footballer) (born 1948), former Gaelic footballer
 John Smith Purdy (1872–1936), Scots-born physician in Australia